The Kalinin K-2 (Russian Калинин К-2) was a Soviet airliner designed and built by the designer Konstantin Kalinin.  The aircraft was a variant of the predecessor K-1 with a stronger engine and an all-metal construction.  The total weight of the construction exceeded that of the planning considerably.  The first flight took place in 1926.  The assembly was more complex than the K-1, but only four were built.

Development 
Kalinin was assigned to the yard of the airline Ukrovsdukhput after the registration of the K-1 design in Kharkiv as a construction site.  The yard was then renamed GROS (Graschdanskoje Opytnoje Samoleostrojenie, pilot aircraft construction for civil aviation).  Shortly thereafter, it was referred to only as a "series work".  Here Kalinin gathered his best employees around and planned the further development of the K-1.  The planning group included I. G. Neman, S. I. Iskovich, A. J. Shcherbakov, and W. J. Krilow.

Construction 
The fuselage consisted of a welded tubular steel framework and was clad with light-alloy sheet metal from Koltschug aluminum.  The construction was designed as a high wing monoplane whose wings were braced to the lower part of the trunk body.  The wings had an elliptical shape and were, like the tail, made of tubular steel and also covered with light metal sheets.  The tail had a normal shape (tail fins strutted to the fuselage).  All control surfaces were covered with fabric.  The chassis was fixed and provided with a continuous axle.  At the rear of the fuselage was a sprung tailspur.  The pilot sat in a closed cabin.

Variants
K-2 refined K-1 first flown in 1926, used by Ukrovsdukhput
K-3 Ambulance variant of the K-2 with accommodation for one doctor with 2 stretcher patients or four seated patients.

Specifications

References

Further reading
 Heinz A. F. Schmidt: Historische Flugzeuge Teil II. Motorbuch, Stuttgart 1970.
 Heinz A. F. Schmidt: Sowjetische Flugzeuge. Transpress, Berlin, S. 35.
 В. Б. Шавров: История конструкций самолетов в СССР до 1938. S. 416.

1920s Soviet and Russian airliners
Kalinin aircraft